American Child is the second studio album by American country music artist Phil Vassar. Released in 2002, the album initially contained twelve tracks, with the title track serving as the lead-off single, reaching top 5 on the Billboard Hot Country Singles & Tracks (now Hot Country Songs) charts.

After the lead-off single fell from the charts, Arista tested another song entitled "This Is God". This song received such positive feedback from its test audience that the album was recalled and re-released in 2003 with "This Is God" (and a cover of Huey Lewis and the News' "Workin' for a Livin'") added to the track listing. The former was also released as a single, reaching Top 20 on the country charts, while the third single ("Ultimate Love") peaked at number 41, becoming the first single of Vassar's career to miss Top 40 entirely.

Vassar produced the album with Byron Gallimore except for "This Is God", which Vassar produced with Dann Huff instead.

Although it was not issued  as a single, "Athens Grease" was made into a music video.

Track listing

Personnel
 Mike Brignardello - bass guitar
 Pat Buchanan - electric guitar
 Perry Coleman - background vocals 
 Paul Franklin - steel guitar
 Carl Gorodetzky - string contractor
 Aubrey Haynie - fiddle, mandolin
 Michael Landau - electric guitar 
 B. James Lowry - electric guitar 
 Brent Mason - electric guitar 
 Gene Miller - background vocals 
 Steve Nathan - keyboards
 Michael Omartian - string arrangements 
 Clayton Ryder - accordion
 Jeff Smith - background vocals 
 Russell Terrell - background vocals 
 Phil Vassar - piano, lead vocals 
 Biff Watson - acoustic guitar
 Lonnie Wilson - drums

Chart performance

References 

2002 albums
Albums produced by Byron Gallimore
Arista Records albums
Phil Vassar albums